The 2020 Cork Junior A Hurling Championship was the 123rd staging of the Cork Junior A Hurling Championship since its establishment by the Cork County Board in 1895. The championship began on 3 October 2020, however, it was suspended indefinitely due to the impact of the COVID-19 pandemic on Gaelic games. After being restarted the championship eventually ended on 7 August 2021.

On 7 August 2021, Lisgoold won the championship after a 2-19 to 0-16 win over Harbour Rovers in the final at Páirc Uí Rinn. This was their first ever championship title.

Format change 

The championship had featured 14 teams, comprising the divisional champions and runners-up, since 2017. Because of time constraints as a result of the ongoing COVID-19 pandemic it was decided to revert to the old system of allowing only the divisional champions take part.

Qualification

Duhallow Junior A Hurling Championship 
Group A

Group B

Final

Kilbrin 2-13 - 0-30 Dromtarriffe

Results

Quarter-finals

Harbour Rovers received a bye in this round.

Semi-finals

Final

Championship statistics

Top scorers

Top scorers overall

In a single game

References

External link 

 Cork GAA website

Cork Junior Hurling Championship
2020 in Irish sport
Cork Junior Hurling Championship